This is a list of notable alumni and faculty of Central Michigan University.

Alumni

Acting
 Tim Allen – actor, Toy Story, Home Improvement (attended; transferred to Western Michigan University)
 Larry Joe Campbell – actor, co-starred on According to Jim as Andy
 Jeff Daniels – Emmy-winning actor, Terms of Endearment, Arachnophobia, Gettysburg, Dumb and Dumber, Good Night, and Good Luck, The Newsroom
 Carter Oosterhouse – reality TV star of Trading Spaces
 Terry O'Quinn – Emmy-winning actor, co-starred on Lost as John Locke
 Amy Roloff – reality TV star of Little People, Big World
 Brad Slaight – actor, The Young and the Restless, Love Chronicles, Unsolved Mysteries; comedian

Broadcasting
 Cam Brainard - Voiceover artist and broadcaster
 Dick Enberg – Emmy-winning sports broadcaster
 Clark Howard – syndicated consumer talk-show host
 Edythe Lewis – pioneering Black disc jockey
 Lem Tucker – Emmy-winning correspondent, CBS News

Journalism
 Terry Foster – The Detroit News columnist and WXYT-FM radio host
 John Grogan –  author of best-selling memoir Marley & Me and Philadelphia Inquirer columnist
 Lorrie Lynch – weekend editor, columnist, USA Today magazine
 Drew Sheneman – award-winning editorial cartoonist, The Star-Ledger

Politics and military

 Alveda King – activist, author, and former state representative for the 28th District in the Georgia House Of Representatives. Niece of Civil Rights leader Martin Luther King Jr. 
 Ralph Baker – U.S. Army brigadier general
 Matt Bevin- Former Governor of Kentucky   
 Kevin Cotter – former speaker of the Michigan House of Representatives
 Vivien Crea – U.S. Coast Guard vice admiral and 25th Vice Commandant of the United States Coast Guard
 Michael P. DeLong – U.S. Marine Corps lieutenant general
 Robert P. Griffin – United States Senator and House of Representatives member
 Scott Haraburda – U.S. Army colonel and president of Indiana Society of Professional Engineers
 Joseph R. Inge – U.S. Army lieutenant general
 Reuben D. Jones – U.S. Army major general
 William F. Kernan – U.S. Army general and commander of Joint Forces Command
 Dan Kildee – United States Representative for Michigan's 5th congressional district 
 Andrea LaFontaine – represents 32nd District in Michigan House of Representatives
 Brenda Lawrence – United States Representative for Michigan's 14th congressional district, former mayor of Southfield, Michigan, and 2010 Democratic Party nominee for Lieutenant Governor of Michigan
 Michael R. Lehnert – U.S. Marine Corps major general
 Mike Maturen – 2016 United States presidential candidate
 Herbert H. McMillan – former Maryland state delegate
 William Nolde – U.S. Army colonel last official combat casualty of Vietnam War
 Thomas M. Pappas – U.S. Army colonel disciplined from the Abu Ghraib prisoner abuse scandal
 Pete Peterson – U.S. Air Force colonel and Florida Representative
 Lorraine K. Potter – 14th Chief of Chaplains of the United States Air Force
 Philip Potvin – represents 102nd district in Michigan House of Representatives
 Joseph Ralston – U.S. Air Force general and commander of NATO
 John W. Raymond –  U.S. Space Force general
 Verlina Reynolds-Jackson, politician who represents the 15th Legislative District in the New Jersey General Assembly.
 Courtney Rogers – U.S. Air Force lieutenant colonel and Tennessee Representative
 Jimmy D. Ross – U.S. Army general and commander of Army Materiel Command
 John B. Sams – U.S. Air Force Lieutenant General and commander of 15th Air Force
 Mary Sheffield - President of the Detroit City Council
 Peter Schoomaker – 35th Chief of Staff of the United States Army
 Norton A. Schwartz – 19th Chief of Staff of the Air Force
 Lance L. Smith – U.S. Air Force general
 Michael D. Steele – U.S. Army colonel
 Stephen Twitty – U.S. Army major general, Commanding Officer Fort Bliss
 Anthony Zinni – businessman and retired U.S. Marine Corps general
 Kissana Phathanacharoen – Deputy Spokesman of the Royal Thai Police and Deputy Commander of Cyber Crime Investigation Bureau (Royal Thai Police)

Sports

 Curtis Adams – National Football League, former running back for the San Diego Chargers
 Phil Baroni – professional MMA fighter formerly with the UFC
 Dan Bazuin – former NFL defensive end for the Chicago Bears
 Walter Beach – former NFL safety for the Cleveland Browns
 Nick Bellore – NFL fullback for the Seattle Seahawks
 Ray Bentley – former NFL linebacker, primarily with the Buffalo Bills; ESPN broadcaster
 Jim Bowman – former NFL defensive back for the New England Patriots
 Mark Brisker – American-Israeli professional basketball player
 Antonio Brown –  NFL wide receiver for the Tampa Bay Buccaneers
 Josh Collmenter – MLB player currently with the Arizona Diamondbacks
 Paris Cotton – CFL running back with the Winnipeg Blue Bombers
 Tom Crean – head men's basketball coach for the Indiana Hoosiers (2008–2017)
 Todd Dagenais – head coach for UCF Knights women's volleyball
 Titus Davis – former wide receiver
 Tony F. Elliott – former NFL defensive back for the Green Bay Packers
 Paul Emmel – MLB umpire
 Dietrich Enns – MLB pitcher
 Tony Ferguson (attended) – mixed martial artist, The Ultimate Fighter 13 winner, currently competing in the UFCs Lightweight Division
 Eric Fisher – NFL offensive tackle for the Indianapolis Colts
 Eric Ghiaciuc – former NFL center for the Cincinnati Bengals
 Josh Gordy – NFL defensive back for the Indianapolis Colts
 Brock Gutierrez – former NFL center, primarily for the Detroit Lions
 Gary Hogeboom – former NFL quarterback for the Dallas Cowboys
 Nate Huffman – professional basketball player, 2001 Israeli Basketball Premier League MVP
 Tory Humphrey – former NFL tight end for the New Orleans Saints
 Robert Jackson – former NFL defensive back for the Cincinnati Bengals
 Cullen Jenkins – NFL defensive end for the Washington Football Team
 Stephen Jones – CFL All-Star and Grey Cup champion
 Chris Kaman – former NBA player 
 Adam Kieft – NFL offensive tackle for the Cincinnati Bengals
 Chris Knapp – MLB pitcher
 Dan LeFevour – former NFL quarterback with the Jacksonville Jaguars, Chicago Bears, and Indianapolis Colts
 Andy MacDonald – head coach for Northern Arizona Lumberjacks football (1965–1968)
 James McElroy – former NBA player for the New Orleans Jazz and the Atlanta Hawks  
 Dan Majerle – former NBA player, primarily for the Phoenix Suns
 Zach McKinstry – MLB player currently with the Los Angeles Dodgers
 Suzy Merchant – women's basketball head coach, Michigan State
 Drew Mormino – NFL offensive lineman for the Miami Dolphins
 Shane Morris – Arena Football League quarterback for the Baltimore Brigade
 Marguerite Pearson – All-American Girls Professional Baseball League player and athletic instructor at CMU
 Kito Poblah – former CFL wide receiver, primarily for the Winnipeg Blue Bombers
 Jim Podoley – former NFL wide receiver for the Washington Redskins
 Ben Poquette – former NBA player for the Detroit Pistons
 Ryan Radcliff – former quarterback
 Thomas Rawls – NFL running back for the Seattle Seahawks
 Mose Rison – head coach for North Carolina Central Eagles football (2007–2010)
 Dan Roundfield – former NBA player, primarily with the Atlanta Hawks
 Cooper Rush – NFL quarterback for the Dallas Cowboys
 Chase Simon (born 1989) – basketball player for Maccabi Ashdod of the Israeli Basketball Premier League
 Joe Staley – NFL offensive tackle, first-round draft pick of the San Francisco 49ers (2007)
 George "The Animal" Steele – professional wrestler
 Kevin Tapani – former MLB pitcher, primarily with the Minnesota Twins
 Zurlon Tipton – former NFL running back for the Indianapolis Colts
 Tom Tresh – 1962 AL Rookie of the Year, shortstop, primarily with the New York Yankees
 Jonathan Ward – NFL running back for the Arizona Cardinals
 J. J. Watt – NFL defensive lineman for the Houston Texans; left school after one year
 Curt Young – former MLB pitcher, current pitching coach with the Oakland Athletics
 Frank Zombo – NFL linebacker for the Kansas City Chiefs

Miscellaneous
 Jeffrey R. Caponigro – president and CEO of Caponigro Public Relations, Inc
 Harold Cronk – screenwriter, director, producer and founding partner at 10 West Studios
 Alex Cruz – Former British Airways CEO
 Andrew Dost – pianist in the Grammy Award-winning band Fun
 DDG – Youtuber and rapper
 Dennis Frederiksen – vocalist
 Brandi Love – pornographic actress
 Guy Newland – Professor of Philosophy and Religion
 Karen J. Nichols – physician and former medical school dean
 Terry Nichols – participant in the Oklahoma City bombing (attended 1 semester)
 Jennifer Schomaker, chemist, professor, researcher
 Bill Schwab – fine art photographer
 Keith Sintay – animation artist
 Lori Nelson Spielman – author
 C. W. Thornthwaite – geographer and climatologist

Faculty
 Stephen M. Colarelli – Psychology Professor

References

Central Michigan University people